An open letter is a letter that is intended to be read by a wide audience, or a letter intended for an individual, but that is nonetheless widely distributed intentionally.

Open letters usually take the form of a letter addressed to an individual but provided to the public through newspapers and other media, such as a letter to the editor or blog.  Especially common are critical open letters addressed to political leaders.

Letters patent are another form of open letter in which a legal document is both mailed to a person by the government and publicized so that all are made aware of it.  Open letters can also be addressed directly to a group rather than any individual.

Two of the most famous and influential open letters are J'accuse...! by Émile Zola to the President of France, accusing the French government of wrongfully convicting Alfred Dreyfus for alleged espionage, and Martin Luther King Jr.'s Letter from Birmingham Jail, including the famous quotation "Injustice anywhere is a threat to justice everywhere".

Motivations for writing
There are a number of reasons why an individual would choose the form of an open letter, including the following reasons:
 As a last resort to ask the public to judge the letter's recipient or others involved, often but not always, in a critical light
 To state the author's position on a particular issue
 As an attempt to start or end a wider dialogue around an issue
 As an attempt to focus broad attention on the letter's recipient, prompting them to some action
 For humor value
 Simply to make public a communication that must take place as a letter for reasons of formality
Eric Kaufmann characterizes the authoring of open letters in academia as a form of "hard authoritarianism" accompanying political correctness and cancel culture.

See also
 Epistolary poem
 Polemic
 White paper
 Persuasive writing

External links

References

Letters (message)
Activism by type